Still is the third solo studio album by English keyboardist and songwriter Tony Banks,  released in 1991 on Virgin Records in the UK and Giant Records in the U.S. The album was originally going to be named after the track Still It Takes Me by Surprise, but was later shortened to Still. Despite a fairly heavy promotional effort by Giant Records, the album failed to sell well.

Track listing
All tracks written by Tony Banks, except where indicated.

 "Red Day on Blue Street" (Banks, Nik Kershaw) – 5:53
 "Angel Face" – 5:23
 "The Gift" – 4:00
 "Still It Takes Me by Surprise" – 6:32
 "Hero for an Hour" – 5:01
 "I Wanna Change the Score" (Banks, Kershaw) – 4:34
 "Water Out of Wine" – 4:43
 "Another Murder of a Day" (Banks, Fish) – 9:13
 "Back to Back" – 4:38
 "The Final Curtain" – 5:01

Singles
 I Wanna Change the Score (May 7, 1991)
 "I Wanna Change the Score" (with Nik Kershaw)
 "Hero for the Hour"
 "Big Man" (by Bankstatement)
 "The Waters of Lethe"

 The Gift (July 22, 1991)
 "The Gift" (with Andy Taylor)
 "Back to Back" (with Jayney Klimek)
 "A House Needs a Roof" (by Bankstatement)
 "Redwing"

 Still It Takes Me By Surprise (February 24, 1992)
 "Still It Takes Me by Surprise" (edit) (with Andy Taylor)
 "The Final Curtain" (with Nik Kershaw)
 "Still It Takes Me by Surprise" (with Andy Taylor)

Personnel 
 Tony Banks – keyboards, synth bass (1, 3, 5, 9, 10), drum programming (2, 3, 7), vocals (5, 9, 10)
 Daryl Stuermer – guitars 
 Pino Palladino – bass (2, 4, 7, 8, 10)
 James Eller – bass (6)
 Vinnie Colaiuta – drums (1, 5, 8, 9, 10), hi-hat (3), cymbals (3)
 Graham Broad – drums (6)
 Nick Davis – drum programming (7)
 Luís Jardim – percussion (1, 5-8)
 Martin Robertson – saxophone (1, 5)
 Nik Kershaw – vocals (1, 6, 10)
 Fish – vocals (2, 8)
 Andy Taylor – vocals (3, 4)
 Jayney Klimek – vocals (7, 9), backing vocals (2)

Production 
 Tony Banks – producer 
 Nick Davis – producer, engineer 
 Mark Robinson – assistant engineer 
 Mark Bowen – technical assistance
 Geoff Callingham – technical assistance
 Carl Studna – photography 
 Wherefore Art? – design

References

1991 albums
Tony Banks (musician) albums
Albums produced by Nick Davis (record producer)
Virgin Records albums
Giant Records (Warner) albums